The 2003 Northern Iowa Panthers football team represented the University of Northern Iowa as a member of the Gateway Football Conference during the 2003 NCAA Division I-AA football season. Led by third-year head coach Mark Farley, the Panthers compiled an overall record of 10–3 with a mark of 6–1 in conference play, winning the Gateway  title. Northern Iowa advanced to the NCAA Division I-AA Football Championship playoffs, where they beat Montana State in the first round before falling to eventual national champion Delaware in the quarterfinals.

Schedule

References

Northern Iowa
Northern Iowa Panthers football seasons
Missouri Valley Football Conference champion seasons
Northern Iowa Panthers football